Juzancourt is an old municipality in the French departement of Ardennes, absorbed since le 1 January 1971, by the municipality of Asfeld.

Notes and references

References

Geography of Ardennes (department)